Mihai Popescu (born 7 May 1993) is a Romanian footballer who plays as a defender for Liga I club Farul Constanța.

Career
Popescu joined Scottish Premiership side St Mirren in January 2019 on loan until the end of the season. In June 2019 the possibility that the deal would be extended was thrown into doubt after St Mirren manager Oran Kearney left the club, and Popescu returned to Bucharest in July.

In September 2020, Popescu signed a two-year contract with Scottish Championship club Hearts. On 31 August 2021 he joined Hamilton Academical on loan until the end of the season.

Popescu left Hearts at the end of the 2021/22 season and then returned to Romania, signing a two-year contract with Farul Constanta.

Honours
Dinamo București
Cupa Ligii: 2016–17
Voluntari
Supercupa României: 2017
Heart of Midlothian
Scottish Championship: 2020–21

References

External links
 
 

1993 births
Living people
Sportspeople from Câmpulung
Romanian footballers
Association football defenders
Liga I players
Liga II players
FC Dinamo București players
FC Dunărea Călărași players
FC Voluntari players
Scottish Professional Football League players
St Mirren F.C. players
Heart of Midlothian F.C. players
Hamilton Academical F.C. players
FCV Farul Constanța players
Romanian expatriate footballers
Romanian expatriate sportspeople in Scotland
Expatriate footballers in Scotland